Ion Niță (born 21 February 1948) is a Romanian former footballer who played as a midfielder and forward. He was part of "U" Craiova's team that won the 1973–74 Divizia A, which was the first trophy in the club's history.

Honours
Universitatea Craiova
 Divizia A: 1973–74

Notes

References

1948 births
Living people
Romanian footballers
Association football midfielders
Liga I players
Liga II players
FC Argeș Pitești players
CS Universitatea Craiova players
FC Brașov (1936) players
People from Dâmbovița County